Andrea Lane Zinga is a former television reporter who ran twice as the Republican nominee for Congress in .

Personal history
Zinga was born and raised in Macomb, Illinois and is a graduate of Macomb High School. She has a bachelor's degree in education from Western Illinois University and a master's degree in communications from the University of Illinois at Urbana–Champaign.

Career in television
Zinga has been a radio and television reporter and anchorwoman for all three television stations in the Quad Cities-- WQAD-TV, KWQC-TV (while it was still WOC-TV) and WHBF-TV.   She also worked for three years at CNN, CNN Headline News and The Airport Channel (a CNN network provided exclusively to airports). While at CNN, Zinga was the first anchor to report the breaking story of the Centennial Olympic Park bombing on July 27, 1996 for which she earned a national Emmy. On her way up in the TV News business, Zinga worked at WAFB-TV Channel 9, the CBS affiliate in Baton Rouge, Louisiana, as well as KBMT in Beaumont, Texas.

2004 congressional race
Zinga ran for Congress in the 17th District in 2004 against 11-term incumbent Democrat Lane Evans. Playing on the similarity between her middle name and Evans first name, her campaign slogan was "It's time to change Lanes."

Zinga stirred controversy by using Evans health as a campaign issue, stating that he suffered seriously enough from Parkinson's disease to put his efficacy as a congressman into question. These statements did not sit well with the local media and many voters in the district, who felt this amounted to "kicking a man when he is down," although at least one newspaper, the News Gazette (Champaign Urbana) opined that the health and ability to serve as an official elected by the people and paid by taxpayers was information vital to voters—and many voters agreed. She ended up taking 39% of the votes (111,615 votes), due largely to the district's large number of registered democrats, Evans strong name recognition, and Zinga's largely underfunded candidacy.

2006 congressional race
Zinga won a highly contested primary on March 21, 2006. Defeating Jim Mowen and Brian Gilliland. She garnered 42 percent of the votes, winning by 325 votes attributable. She felt that to her efforts in the many small counties at that time, made up a highly-gerrymandered 17th IL district. Zinga was going to be facing Evans again in 2006. However, Evans announced his retirement and withdrawal from the race after the March primary because of the increasingly debilitating effects of Parkinson's disease. After a vote by democratic precinct committeemen from the 17th congressional district, Evans district director, Phil Hare, was picked to be the democratic candidate to face Zinga in November. Hare defeated Zinga by 14 points.

Zinga opposes gun control and strongly supported the American effort in Iraq in the context of the larger war on terrorism. She is pro-life but supports exceptions to protect the life of the mother and in the cases of rape and incest if reported within 72 hours.

Zinga has expressed support for secondary screenings for anyone who flags as a potential security risk in boarding airplanes -"Middle Eastern men and Irish grandmothers."

Zinga had been endorsed by the Peoria Journal Star for the 17th Congressional District and the Quincy Herald-Whig.

Electoral history 
2004 17th District congressional race
Lane Evans (D) 61% - 172,320 votes
Andrea Zinga (R) 39% - 111,680 votes
2006 17th District Republican congressional primary
Andrea Zinga 42.1% - 13,287 votes
Jim Mowen 41.2% - 12,962 votes
Brian Gilliland 16.7% - 5,241 votes
2006 17th District congressional race
Phil Hare (D) 57.21% - 114,638 votes
Andrea Zinga (R) 42.79% - 85,734 votes

References

External links
2006 campaign results

People from Macomb, Illinois
Western Illinois University alumni
University of Illinois Urbana-Champaign alumni
American television journalists
Journalists from Illinois
Illinois Republicans
Living people
Women in Illinois politics
Year of birth missing (living people)
American women television journalists
21st-century American women